Robert Pratt (born May 25, 1951) is a former American football guard in the National Football League (NFL).  He graduated from  St. Christopher’s School in 1970 where he garnered All Prep League honors.

College career
Robert Pratt earned a scholarship to the University of North Carolina at Chapel Hill where he played for Head Coach Bill Dooley.  He was a three-year starter at left tackle and was an All American and All ACC selection.  His team won two ACC Championships in 1971 and 1972.  The 1972 team achieved the school's first 11-1 season culminating in a Sun Bowl victory against Texas Tech.

Professional career
In the 1974 NFL draft, Robert Pratt was selected in the third round by the Baltimore Colts.  He started at left guard from 1975 to 1981, playing in 105 consecutive games.  He helped his team win three straight AFC East Division Titles (1975–77).  He was a key protector of NFL MVP and Pro Bowl quarterback Bert Jones.

In 1982, Pratt was traded to the Seattle Seahawks where he helped the franchise get into the playoffs in 1983 and 1984, the first such appearances in the franchise's history.  He started in the AFC title game after the 1983 season.  In 1983, he was voted by the organization as the Lineman of the Year.

After a twelve-year career, he retired in 1986.

After Football
Robert Pratt lives in Richmond, Virginia.  He is the chairman and CEO of Mid-Atlantic Golf, Inc., the owner of Sycamore Creek Golf Course in Manakin-Sabot, Virginia. He was inducted into the Virginia Sports Hall of Fame in 2013.

External links
 Sycamore Creek Golf Course

1951 births
Living people
Players of American football from Richmond, Virginia
American football offensive linemen
St. Christopher's School (Richmond, Virginia) alumni
North Carolina Tar Heels football players
Baltimore Colts players
Seattle Seahawks players